VH-6 (Rescue Squadron 6) was one of six dedicated (VH) Rescue Squadrons of the U.S. Navy during WWII. A more comprehensive write-up on the VH squadrons can be found in the history of Rescue Squadron 3 (VH-3), which was the US Navy's most active VH squadron. In the final week of the war, VH-6 rescued 13 aviators off the coast of Japan. VH-6 was established in January 1945 and disestablished in February 1946. The squadron employed the  Martin PBM Mariner during its operations.

Operational history 
 January 1945: VH-6 was established at NAS San Diego, California..
 27 July 1945: VH-6 commences rescue operations around Okinawa, joining Rescue Squadron VH-3 which has been there since April. 
 8-10 August 1945: VH-6 rescues 13 downed aviators off Japan.
 14 August 1945: While on a standby mission for a USAAF bomber strike, a PBM from VH-6 is harassed by three Zero Fighters. The  Lockheed P-38 Lightning escort is called for assistance. In the ensuing melee, one attacking Zero is shot down and another is listed as a probable. The third Zero escapes after shooting down one of the P-38's (whose pilot does not survive).
 November–December 1945: VH-6 performs operations in the Yellow Sea.
 February 1946: VH-6 was disestablished.

See also 
 VH-3 (Rescue squadron)
 VH-6 squadron [1]
 VH squadrons [2]
 USS Pine Island (AV-12)
 USS Rehoboth (AVP-50)
 USS Floyds Bay (AVP-40)
 Dumbo (air-sea rescue)
 Seaplane tender
 Flying boat
 Air-sea rescue
 List of inactive United States Navy aircraft squadrons

References 

Rescue squadrons of the United States Navy